The Denton J. Paul Water Tank near Dietrich, Idaho, United States, was built in c.1918, perhaps by stonemason Ignacio Berriochoa and his helper Julian Pagoaga;  Berriochoa lived about three miles away.  It was listed on the National Register of Historic Places in 1983.

It is located on the farm of Denton J. Paul who owned and occupied it during 1911 to 1928, receiving final patent on it in 1918. It has rubble walls with mortar that is nearly flush, but is pointed to one-inch wide indentations.

References

Agricultural buildings and structures on the National Register of Historic Places
Buildings and structures in Lincoln County, Idaho
Agricultural buildings and structures on the National Register of Historic Places in Idaho
Water tanks on the National Register of Historic Places
Towers completed in 1910
National Register of Historic Places in Lincoln County, Idaho
1910s establishments in Idaho